Babbington is a hamlet in Nottinghamshire, England. It is located 2 miles south of Kimberley, close to the M1 motorway. It is part of Kimberley civil parish.

External links
 Babbington Dog Rescue. A page of information with link to their web site

External links

Hamlets in Nottinghamshire
Places in the Borough of Broxtowe